Niranjan Parajuli (Nepali: निरञ्जन पराजुली) is a Nepali chemist, biochemist and biotechnologist, who was President of Nepal Chemical Society (2019-2021) and Professor of Chemistry at the Central Department of Chemistry, Tribhuvan University, Nepal. Parajuli is also an advocate for change in the Nepali education system, writing op-eds for national dailies, particularly focusing on higher education. EduRank has sorted Professor Parajuli as a notable alumnus of Tribhuvan University.

Personal life 
Niranjan Parajuli was born in Kathmandu, the capital of Nepal to Govinda Prasad Parajuli (Nepali: गोविन्द प्रसाद पराजुली) and his wife Durga Parajuli (Nepali: दुर्गा पराजुली), on August 1972. He is married to Madhabi Bhatta who is a Nepali journalist and former commissioner of the Truth and Reconciliation Commission, Nepal.

Religious views 
In an interview by a Nepali Science Magazine, RevoScience dating to 2016, Parajuli has clarified that he believes in religion however is secular, he has added that he is not able to lead religion, because there are certain things which even science is unable to clarify.

Public affairs 
Parajuli, has been voicing in controversial issues, including in a topic related to compensation in land procurement, going as far as protesting against constructing a park at the township, meant for public welfare.

Education 
Parajuli has received his Bachelor of Science majoring in Physics, Chemistry and Mathematics from Tribhuvan University. He then, completed his Master of Science degree majoring in Chemistry from the same university, passing with a distinction, and topping the university. Parajuli received his doctorate from Department of Chemistry, Institute of Biomolecule Reconstruction at Sun Moon University, Korea in 2004. His PhD dissertation focuses on manipulation of antibiotic biosynthetic pathway and bioorganic chemistry.

Career and research 
Parajuli began his career from Kathmandu University as a lecturer of Chemistry in 1998. He was promoted to assistant professor at the same institution in 2004. He was a postdoctoral researcher from 2005-2009 at Ewha Womans University, upon completion of PhD from Sun Moon University. He assumed the role of research professor at the same university in 2009. Early 2010 to late 2011 he was a postdoctoral research associate at North Carolina State University. As a biotechnologist, from 2012 he led the Department of Biotechnology, National College, Tribhuvan University, as the head.

Teaching 
Parajuli started his teaching career from Kathmandu University in 1998, continuing teaching activities from  other institutions after leaving Kathmandu University, he has been appointed as a teaching full professor in 2018.

Research 
Parajuli's research is mostly focused on microbial biotechnology, enzyme technology, protein engineering and combinatorial chemistry. He is also active in research using applied biophysics in the field of biochemistry and computational chemistry. He has also published his research works in the field of nanotechnology, from a biological point of view. In 2009, he was appointed as a research full professor. As of 2020, Parajuli has projects in the fields of computational chemistry, identification  of enzyme inhibitors from plant sources to treat diabetes, and genetic characterization of actinomycetes for antibiotics production. He also is the chief scientific advisor to a project on investigation of secondary metabolites from natural products with a computational chemistry and immunochemistry approach on COVID-19.

Awards, honors and other experiences 

 1998 Mahendra Vidya Bhushan B
 2005 Mahendra Vidya Bhushan A
 2007 Science and Technology Youth Award
 2011- Reviewer, Biotechnology Letters 
 2011- Reviewer, Journal of Industrial Microbiology & Biotechnology
 2011-2012 Reviewer, Journal of Bioscience and Bioengineering
 2013- Reviewer, Nepal Journal of Science and Technology
 2014- Reviewer, Journal of Applied Microbiology
 2018 President, Nepal Chemical Society
 2019- Reviewer, International Journal of Environment
 2021 - Guest Editor Processes Special Issue "Isolation, Detection, and Quantification of Antibiotics"
 2022- Academic Editor: Evidence-Based Complementary and Alternative Medicine

Selected publications 
As from Google Scholar, Parajuli is credited as an (co)author for the following works:
 Dawadi, S.; Thapa, R.; Modi, B.; Bhandari, S.; Timilsina, A.P.; Yadav, R.P.; Aryal, B.; Gautam, S.; Sharma, P.; Thapa, B.B.; Aryal, N.; Aryal, S.; Regmi, B.P.; Parajuli, N. Technological advancements for the detection of antibiotics in food products. Processes 2021, 9, 1500. https://doi.org/10.3390/pr9091500
 Adhikari, Bikash, Bishnu P. Marasini, Binod Rayamajhee, Bibek Raj Bhattarai, Ganesh Lamichhane, Karan Khadayat, Achyut Adhikari, Santosh Khanal, and Niranjan Parajuli. Potential roles of medicinal plants for the treatment of viral diseases focusing on COVID‐19: A review. Phytotherapy Research 35, no. 3 (2021): 1298-1312.
 Lamichhane, Ganesh, Ashis Acharya, Darbin Kumar Poudel, Babita Aryal, Narayan Gyawali, Purushottam Niraula, Sita Ram Phuyal, Prakriti Budhathoki, Ganesh Bk, and Niranjan Parajuli. Recent advances in bioethanol production from Lignocellulosic biomass. International Journal of Green Energy 18, no. 7 (2021): 731-744.
 Marahatha, Rishab, Saroj Basnet, Bibek Raj Bhattarai, Prakriti Budhathoki, Babita Aryal, Bikash Adhikari, Ganesh Lamichhane, Darbin Kumar Poudel, and Niranjan Parajuli. Potential natural inhibitors of xanthine oxidase and HMG-CoA reductase in cholesterol regulation: in silico analysis. BMC complementary medicine and therapies 21, no. 1 (2021): 1-11.
 Dawadi, Sonika, Saurav Katuwal, Aakash Gupta, Uttam Lamichhane, Ranjita Thapa, Shankar Jaisi, Ganesh Lamichhane, Deval Prasad Bhattarai, and Niranjan Parajuli. Current research on silver nanoparticles: Synthesis, characterization, and applications. Journal of Nanomaterials 2021 (2021).
 Aryal, Babita, Purushottam Niraula, Karan Khadayat, Bikash Adhikari, Dadhiram Khatri Chhetri, Basanta Kumar Sapkota, Bibek Raj Bhattarai, Niraj Aryal, and Niranjan Parajuli. Antidiabetic, Antimicrobial, and Molecular Profiling of Selected Medicinal Plants. Evidence-Based Complementary and Alternative Medicine 2021 (2021).
 Joshi, Bishnu, Sujogya Kumar Panda, Ramin Saleh Jouneghani, Maoxuan Liu, Niranjan Parajuli, Pieter Leyssen, Johan Neyts, and Walter Luyten. Antibacterial, antifungal, antiviral, and anthelmintic activities of medicinal plants of Nepal selected based on ethnobotanical evidence. Evidence-Based Complementary and Alternative Medicine 2020 (2020).
 Awal, R.P., Garcia, R., Gemperlein, K., Wink, J., Kunwar, B., Parajuli, N., and Müller, R. (2017). Vitiosangium cumulatum gen. nov., sp. nov. and Vitiosangium subalbum sp. nov., soil myxobacteria, and emended descriptions of the genera Archangium and Angiococcus, and of the family Cystobacteraceae. International Journal of Systematic and Evolutionary Microbiology 67, 1422–1430.
 Joshi, B., Hendrickx, S., Magar, L., Parajuli, N., Dorny, P., and Maes, L. (2016). In vitro Antileishmanial and Antimalarial Activity of Selected Plants of Nepal. J Intercult Ethnopharmacol 5, 383.
 Parajuli, N., and Williams, G.J. (2011). A high-throughput screen for directed evolution of aminocoumarin amide synthetases. Analytical Biochemistry 419, 61–66.
 Park, J.W., Hong, J.S.J., Parajuli, N., Jung, W.S., Park, S.R., Lim, S.-K., Sohng, J.K., and Yoon, Y.J. (2008). Genetic dissection of the biosynthetic route to gentamicin A2 by heterologous expression of its minimal gene set. Proceedings of the National Academy of Sciences 105, 8399–8404.
 Park, J.W., Hong, J.S.J., Parajuli, N., Koh, H.S., Park, S.R., Lee, M.-O., Lim, S.-K., and Yoon, Y.J. (2007). Analytical Profiling of Biosynthetic Intermediates Involved in the Gentamicin Pathway of Micromonospora echinospora by High-Performance Liquid Chromatography Using Electrospray Ionization Mass Spectrometric Detection. Anal. Chem. 79, 4860–4869.
Parajuli, N., Basnet, D.B., Chung, Y.S., Lee, H.C., Liou, K., and Sohng, J.K. (2005). Biochemical characterization of a novel thermostable glucose-1-phosphate thymidylyltransferase from Thermuscaldophilus: Probing the molecular basis for its unusual thermostability. Enzyme and Microbial Technology 37, 402–409.
 Bhandari, D. P., Poudel, D. K., Satyal, P., Khadayat, K., Dhami, S., Aryal, D., Chaudhary, P., Ghimire, A., & Parajuli, N. (2021). Volatile Compounds and Antioxidant and Antimicrobial Activities of Selected Citrus Essential Oils Originated from Nepal. Molecules, 26(21), 6683. https://doi.org/10.3390/molecules26216683
 Adhikari, A., Bhattarai, B. R., Aryal, A., Thapa, N., Kc, P., Adhikari, A., Maharjan, S., Chanda, P. B., Regmi, B. P., & Parajuli, N. (2021). Reprogramming natural proteins using unnatural amino acids. RSC Advances, 11(60), 38126–38145. https://doi.org/10.1039/D1RA07028B
 Lamichhane, G., Khadka, S., Acharya, A., & Parajuli, N. (2021). Pretreatment of finger millet straw (Eleusine coracana) for enzymatic hydrolysis towards bioethanol production. Biomass Conversion and Biorefinery. https://doi.org/10.1007/s13399-021-01633-4
 Aryal, B., Adhikari, B., Aryal, N., Bhattarai, B. R., Khadayat, K., & Parajuli, N. (2021). LC-HRMS Profiling and Antidiabetic, Antioxidant, and Antibacterial Activities of Acacia catechu (L.f.) Willd. BioMed Research International, 2021, e7588711. https://doi.org/10.1155/2021/7588711
 Modi, B., Timilsina, H., Bhandari, S., Achhami, A., Pakka, S., Shrestha, P., Kandel, D., Gc, D. B., Khatri, S., Chhetri, P. M., & Parajuli, N. (2021). Current Trends of Food Analysis, Safety, and Packaging. International Journal of Food Science, 2021, e9924667. https://doi.org/10.1155/2021/9924667
 Marahatha, R., Gyawali, K., Sharma, K., Gyawali, N., Tandan, P., Adhikari, A., Timilsina, G., Bhattarai, S., Lamichhane, G., Acharya, A., Pathak, I., Devkota, H. P., & Parajuli, N. (2021). Pharmacologic activities of phytosteroids in inflammatory diseases: Mechanism of action and therapeutic potentials. Phytotherapy Research, 35(9), 5103–5124. https://doi.org/10.1002/ptr.7138
 Babita Aryal, Bimal Kumar Raut, Salyan Bhattarai, Sobika Bhandari, Parbati Tandan, Kabita Gyawali, Kabita Sharma, Deepa Ranabhat, Ranjita Thapa, Dipa Aryal, Atul Ojha, Hari Prasad Devkota, Niranjan Parajuli, "Potential Therapeutic Applications of Plant-Derived Alkaloids against Inflammatory and Neurodegenerative Diseases", Evidence-Based Complementary and Alternative Medicine, vol. 2022, https://doi.org/10.1155/2022/7299778
 Bhattarai, B. R., Regmi, B. P., Gupta, A., Aryal, B., Adhikari, B., Paudel, M., & Parajuli, N. (2022). Importance of advanced analytical techniques and methods for food quality control and pollution analysis for more sustainable future in the least developed countries. Sustainable Chemistry and Pharmacy, 27, 100692. https://doi.org/10.1016/j.scp.2022.100692

References 

Nepalese biochemists
1972 births
Living people
Academic staff of Tribhuvan University
Tribhuvan University alumni